Sailing into the wind is a sailing expression that refers to a sail boat's ability to move forward despite being headed into (or very nearly into) the wind. A sailboat cannot make headway by sailing directly into the wind (see "Discussion," below); the point of sail into the wind is called "close hauled".  

Sailing into the wind is possible when the sail is angled in a slightly more forward direction than the sail force. In this aspect, the boat will move forward because the keel (centerline), of the boat acts to the water as the sail acts to the wind. The force of the sail is balanced by the force of the keel. This keeps the boat from moving in the direction of the sail force. Although total sail force is to the side when sailing into the wind, a proper angle of attack moves the boat forward.

Another way of stating this is as follows:

In practice, optimal sailing in the direction from which the wind is coming will usually be at a course of around forty five degree angles to the oncoming wind. To reach a particular point, alternating the direction of the wind between the port and starboard side is usually necessary. This is called "tacking."

Discussion

The points of sail clarify the realities of sailing into the wind. One of the points of sail is "Head to Wind." A boat turns through this point on each tack. It is the point at which the boat is neither on port tack or starboard tack and is headed directly into the wind. However, a boat cannot sail directly into the wind, thus if it comes head to the wind it loses steerage and is said to be "in irons." Thus boats sailing into the wind are actually sailing "Close Hauled" (i.e., with sails tightly trimmed).

When one sails closer to the wind than is optimal (i.e., with a too small angle to the wind), it is called "pinching." This phrase is also a colloquial expression meaning "to be reckless."

References

External links
 Counterintuitive Performance of Land and Sea Yachts

Nautical terminology